Wendy Lyon (born 1960)  is a Canadian film and television actress. She began her career in television, appearing on the miniseries Anne of Green Gables (1985) before having a recurring role on the Canadian series The Campbells (1986–1990). She made her feature film debut in a leading role in the supernatural horror film Hello Mary Lou: Prom Night II (1987).

Lyon continued to appear in television throughout the 1990s, including providing the voice of Queen Serenity in the animated series Sailor Moon (1995). She returned to film with supporting roles in Focus (2001) and Childstar (2004). In the 2010s, she appeared in supporting parts in the thriller Regression (2015), Guillermo del Toro's fantasy film The Shape of Water (2017), and in a recurring role in the political thriller series Designated Survivor (2019).

Career
In 1985, Lyon appeared in the Canadian miniseries Anne of Green Gables as Prissy Andrews. The following year, she starred in an episode of American Playhouse, "Valentine's Revenge," opposite Victor Ertmanis. Lyon subsequently had a recurring role as Rebecca Simms in the series The Campbells, on which she appeared between 1986 and 1990. She made her feature film debut as the lead in the supernatural horror film Hello Mary Lou: Prom Night II (1987), playing a teenager haunted (and eventually possessed) by a vengeful spirit. Betsy Sherman praised Lyon's performance, writing that "Lyon does a good job making the transition from fair to foul."

Lyon went on to work in television through the 1980s and 1990s, and provided voice work for multiple episodes of Sailor Moon in 1995. She returned to film with a minor role in the drama Focus (2001), starring William H. Macy and Laura Dern, followed by the independent comedy Childstar (2004). In 2010, she appeared in three episodes of the ABC series Happy Town. Lyon had a minor role in the psychological thriller Regression (2015) before appearing in Guillermo del Toro's critically acclaimed fantasy film The Shape of Water (2017). In 2019, Lyon had a multi-episode arc on the American political thriller series Designated Survivor, starring Kiefer Sutherland.

Personal life
Lyon is married to director Ken Girotti, with whom she has one daughter, Erika.

Filmography

Film

Television

References

External links

1960 births
Canadian film actresses
Canadian television actresses
Canadian voice actresses
20th-century Canadian actresses
21st-century Canadian actresses
Living people